Spilarctia gopara is a moth in the family Erebidae. It was described by Frederic Moore in 1860. It is found in the Indian states of Sikkim and Assam and in Nepal.

References

gopara
Moths described in 1860